

Films

References

Films
2010
2010-related lists